Critical Mass is a 2001 action film directed by Fred Olen Ray (credited as "Ed Raymond") and released direct-to-video. It stars Treat Williams, Lori Loughlin, and Udo Kier. The film features scenes taken straight from other films such as Terminator 2: Judgment Day and Universal Soldier spliced into newly filmed scenes to make up its action sequences.

Plot
The film centers around a group of terrorists who take over a nuclear power plant and a security guard at the plant who tries to stop them.

Cast
 Treat Williams as Mike Jeffers
 Udo Kier as Samson
 Lori Loughlin as Janine
 Blake Clark as Sheriff Borden
 Doug McKeon as Breem
 Andrew Prine as Sen. Cook
 Richard McGonagle as Alan Gould
 Shanna Moakler as Alexandra 
 T.J. Thyne as Karl Wendt
 Charles Cyphers as Henderson
 Jack Betts as Atty. Gen. Ames

Reception
Website Cool Target called it "enjoyable action nonsense" and stated: "Recycled footage to this extent is just lazy and kind of insulting but if you can get past this, Critical Mass is an enjoyably amusing low rent shoot-em up." Moria.co gave the film only one star out of five, calling it "yet another version on Die Hard (1988) and the basic plot template it created of a lone individualistic hero inside a large building/facility single-handedly fending off a terrorist plot." ''

References

External links
 

2000 films
American action films
2000 action films
2000s English-language films
Films directed by Fred Olen Ray
2000s American films